The FIBA Intercontinental Cup, also commonly referred to as the FIBA World Cup for Champion Clubs, or the FIBA Club World Cup, is a professional basketball clubs competition that is endorsed by FIBA and the NBA. Historically, its purpose has been to gather the premier basketball clubs from each of the world's geographical zones, and to officially decide the best basketball club of the world, which is officially crowned as the world club champion. The World Cup for Clubs has been contended mainly by the champions of the continents and/or world geographical regions that are of the highest basketball levels.

The league champions of the National Basketball Association (NBA), which is widely considered the most prestigious basketball league in the world, currently decline participation. The North American spot is instead allocated to the champions of the NBA's developmental league, the G League. The league champions of the EuroLeague, which is considered Europe's most prestigious club competition, are not currently permitted to participate in the competition due to the league's dispute with FIBA. In place of the EuroLeague champions, FIBA Europe instead sends the champions of their main club competition, the Basketball Champions League (BCL).

The champions of the Basketball Africa League (since 2022) and the FIBA Asia Champions Cup (since 2023) also receive a place in the tournament. FIBA has in the past announced plans to expand the tournament to possibly include the champion teams from the Australian National Basketball League (NBL), and possibly the NBA, at some point in the future.

History 
The FIBA Intercontinental Cup competition was originally organized between the years 1966 and 1987. The tournament had its origins with a friendly test game in São Paulo, Brazil, in 1965. The test game was contested by the winners of the South American Championship of Champions Clubs, the Brazilian club S.C. Corinthians Paulista, and the FIBA European Champions Cup (now the EuroLeague) champions, the Spanish club Real Madrid. S.C. Corinthians Paulista won the test game, by a score of 118 to 109. After the success of the test tournament, the first official tournament took place in the year 1966.

In 1973, the competition adopted the name FIBA Intercontinental Cup William Jones, to honour the secretary general of FIBA, William Jones. FIBA tried to rebirth the competition in 1996, by reorganizing the Intercontinental Cup into a best-of-three playoff tournament between the winners of the Euroleague and the winners of the FIBA South American League (the champions of South America). After that tournament, however, the competition was not held until the 2013 edition.

In August 2013, an agreement reached between Euroleague Basketball Company, FIBA Americas, and FIBA World, allowed for the World Cup for Champion Clubs to be relaunched, and to be played between the Euroleague champion and the FIBA Americas League champion.

Four team format (2016–2023) 
In 2016, the tournament again changed format, with the EuroLeague champions no longer being allowed to compete in the tournament due to the EuroLeague's dispute with FIBA. In place of the EuroLeague champions, FIBA Europe began to send the champions of their club competition, originally the FIBA Europe Cup and later the FIBA Champions League, instead. For the 2019 tournament, FIBA increased the competition's number of teams to four, by adding the NBA G League's champions, and also a tournament host club. The tournament was also reconfigured into a final four format.

FIBA has also considered plans to expand the tournament at some point in the future, with plans to add the champion teams from the FIBA AfroLeague, the FIBA Asia Champions Cup, the Australian NBL, and possibly the NBA.

In the 2022 tournament, the league expanded to include the winner of the Basketball Africa League (BAL). From the 2023 tournament, the winners of the FIBA Asia Champions Cup will also be included in the tournament.

Expanded format (2023–present) 
In March 2023, the tournament format received an overhaul. The event was changed from February to September so that it adapts more efficiently to the domestic and continental leagues' calendar and the schedule of international players, and to better accommodate participating clubs.

FIBA also signed a three-year deal partnership with Sport Singapore to hold the competition in the Singapore Sports Hub for three years in a row (until 2025). This makes it the first time in the Intercontinental Cup's history that the event will be held in Asia. Additionally, the tournament was expanded to six teams as an Asian representative was added. For the 2023 edition a team from the Chinese Basketball Association (CBA) was chosen by FIBA to participate.

Names of the competition

FIBA Intercontinental Cup (or FIBA World Cup for Champion Clubs): (1966–1980)
FIBA Club World Cup: (1981)
FIBA Intercontinental Cup (or FIBA World Cup for Champion Clubs): (1982–1984)
FIBA Club World Cup: (1985–1987)
FIBA Intercontinental Cup (or FIBA World Cup for Champion Clubs): (2013–present)
Since 1973, the tournament has also been named in Honor of Renato William Jones, so the tournament's full official names would be either FIBA Intercontinental Cup "William Jones", or FIBA Club World Cup "William Jones".
The tournament is also referred to as the FIBA Intercontinental Cup of Clubs, in order to avoid confusion with the 1972 FIBA Intercontinental Cup of National Teams.

1965 test tournament

The FIBA Intercontinental Cup unofficially began with the friendly competition of the 1965 FIBA Intercontinental Cup Test in São Paulo, Brazil, in 1965. The game was played by the defending champions of the South American Club Championship, S.C. Corinthians Paulista, and the defending champions of the FIBA European Champions Cup (EuroLeague), Real Madrid. It was held at the Ginásio Poliesportivo Parque São Jorge. Corinthians won the game 118 to 109, with Wlamir Marques of S.C. Corinthians scoring 40 points in the game. Due to the test tournament's great success (attendance for the game was 10,000), the FIBA Intercontinental Cup was made an official annual tournament by FIBA. The first official FIBA Intercontinental Cup tournament was then held the following year.

1972 special version

In 1972, FIBA held a 4 team tournament, featuring the Soviet Union national basketball team, the Polish national basketball team, the Brazilian national basketball team, and the NABL All-Stars Team, which participated in the place of Team USA. Although this tournament is not a part of the actual Club World Cup, it is still listed in the event's history as a special version of the tournament and counts as one of the editions, while the actual club competition was on hiatus between the years of 1970 and 1973.

Format
From the 2013 edition of the tournament through to the 2015 edition, the competition was played in either an aggregate score two-legged series, or in a single-game final format between two teams, that determined the official club world champions. Those two teams were the champions of Europe's most prestigious competition, the EuroLeague, and the champions of Latin America's premier competition, the FIBA Americas League.

For the 2016 edition and 2017 edition, the champions of the FIBA Americas League played against the champions of FIBA Europe's main club competition (now second-tier), FIBA Europe Cup (2016) and FIBA Europe's new top competition, the Basketball Champions League (2017), as EuroLeague clubs were no longer allowed to participate by FIBA due to its dispute with Euroleague Basketball.

For the 2019 edition of the tournament, FIBA expanded the competition to include the NBA G League's champions and a tournament host club. Thus, the tournament format was also changed to a final four format involving four teams.

Results

Real Madrid from Spain holds the record for most victories, with a total of five titles.

Statistics

Performance by club 

 The 1965 test tournament and the 1972 tournament for national teams are not included.

Performance by country 

 The 1965 test tournament and the 1972 tournament for national teams are not included.

Winners by confederation

Medals by country

 The 1965 test tournament and the 1972 tournament for national teams are not included.

Individual performances

Top scorers 

 
Wlamir Marques holds the record for most points scored in a single game, when he scored 51 points in the 1965 test tournament. Dražen Petrović was top scorer of the tournament three times, a record. The players' nationalities in the following table are shown by national team.

MVP award

After each tournament, FIBA awards the Most valuable player award to the player that is deemed the most important to his team during the Intercontinental Cup. The first MVP award was given to Walt Szczerbiak Sr. of Real Madrid after he guided them to the 1977 title. The last winner is Bruno Fitipaldo of Lenovo Tenerife in 2023.

Broadcasters
All four games are streamed through FIBA's YouTube channel for free in the USA and the unsold markets with highlights available in all territories. The tournament is also streamed for free through both FIBA's Facebook and NBA G League's Twitch channel, as well as the FIBA-DAZN's subscription streaming service Livebasketball.TV.

See also
McDonald's Championship

Notes

References

Sources
History rosters 1966-87
Sirio 1979 edition

External links 
 FIBA official website
 FIBA Intercontinental Cup official website
 FIBA Intercontinental Cup History
 Basquetepinheirense FIBA World Cup 
 FIBA World Cup of Clubs 

 
International club basketball competitions
Basketball competitions in Europe
Basketball competitions in the Americas
World championships in basketball
Multi-national professional sports leagues